Matthieu Osch (born 1 April 1999) is an alpine skier who was the sole competitor and flag bearer for Luxembourg at the 2018 Winter Olympics Parade of Nations.

References 

1999 births
Living people
Luxembourgian male alpine skiers
Olympic alpine skiers of Luxembourg
Alpine skiers at the 2018 Winter Olympics
Alpine skiers at the 2022 Winter Olympics
Alpine skiers at the 2016 Winter Youth Olympics